The 1953 Major League Baseball season was contested from April 13 to October 12, 1953. It marked the first relocation of an MLB franchise in fifty years, as the Boston Braves moved their NL franchise to Milwaukee, where they would play their home games at the new County Stadium. This was also the first regular season of the televised Major League Baseball Game of the Week, originally broadcast on ABC.

The New York Yankees won their fifth consecutive World Series championship, an MLB record.

Standings

American League

National League

Postseason

Bracket

League leaders

American League

National League

Awards and honors
Baseball Hall of Fame
Ed Barrow
Chief Bender
Tom Connolly
Dizzy Dean
Bill Klem
Al Simmons
Bobby Wallace
Harry Wright
MLB Most Valuable Player Award
 Al Rosen (unanimous), Cleveland Indians, 3B
 Roy Campanella, Brooklyn Dodgers, C
MLB Rookie of the Year Award
 Harvey Kuenn, Detroit Tigers, SS
 Jim Gilliam, Brooklyn Dodgers, 2B
The Sporting News Player of the Year Award
Al Rosen, Cleveland Indians
The Sporting News Pitcher of the Year Award
Bob Porterfield, Washington Senators
Warren Spahn, Milwaukee Braves
The Sporting News Manager of the Year Award
Casey Stengel, New York Yankees

Managers

American League

National League

Home Field Attendance

See also 
 1953 All-American Girls Professional Baseball League season
 1953 Nippon Professional Baseball season

References

External links 
1953 Major League Baseball season schedule at Baseball Reference

 
Major League Baseball seasons